Issa Album is the debut studio album by rapper 21 Savage. It was released on July 7, 2017, through Slaughter Gang and distributed by Epic Records. The album features production from frequent collaborator Metro Boomin, alongside Southside, Pi'erre Bourne, Zaytoven, Wheezy, DJ Mustard and 21 Savage himself. It succeeds 21 Savage's collaborative EP with Metro Boomin, Savage Mode (2016).

Issa Album was supported by the lead single, "Bank Account". The album charted at number two on the US Billboard 200, and received generally positive reviews from critics.

Background
On February 9, 2017, 21 Savage announced the title of the album. On June 29, 21 Savage revealed the album's cover art, along with the release date. On July 2, 2017, 21 Savage confirmed the album's producers.

Promotion
"Issa" featuring Young Thug and Drake, was a planned single to be released on Savage's album. On December 19, 2016, Young Thug posted a video confirming that he will collaborate with 21 Savage on his debut studio album. However in May 2017, the original track was leaked online and made many fans unaware of the song being on the album. It is also been confirmed that 21 Savage has scrapped the song from his studio album.

Singles
The album's lead single, "Bank Account", was released to rhythmic contemporary radio on August 8, 2017. The song peaked at number 12 on the US Billboard Hot 100.

Critical reception

Issa Album was met with generally positive reviews. At Metacritic, which assigns a normalized rating out of 100 to reviews from mainstream publications, the album received an average score of 70, based on 10 reviews. Aggregator AnyDecentMusic? gave it 6.5 out of 10, based on their assessment of the critical consensus.

In XXL, Scott Glaysher opined that the artist "manages to craft a fairly concise project with Issa Album about all the things that make him such a compelling rapper in today's hip-hop landscape". Exclaim!s M.T. Richards wrote that "Savage's strength of feeling against certain people cannot be overstated". Corrigan B of Tiny Mix Tapes noted, "Despite expectations, it's an utter joy to listen to—a simple display of what 21 Savage sounds like when he's having fun rapping". Jon Caramanica of The New York Times wrote positively, "Issa Album contains some of 21 Savage's best and most fully realized songs to date—especially "Bank Account" and "Bad Business". Justin Ivey of HipHopDX stated, "The budding star easily could have played it safe and stuck to a winning formula, which remains a strong suit (i.e. Issas "Bank Account" and "Close My Eyes"). Instead, he challenged himself to be more musically ambitious. While his experiments didn't produce dynamic results, the positives overshadow the negatives".

Steve "Flash" Juon of RapReviews said, "For better or worse the album also achieves a certain bland uniformity at times by staying so true to the trap aesthetic and having Metro Boomin produce so much of the music. It's not ill-conceived, it's just that it all winds up becoming a bit monotonous if you don't randomize it and/or mix in some songs by other artists". Sheldon Pearce of Pitchfork states, "He is so compelling when he digs deeper into his psyche this way, providing more than superficiality, but there aren't enough of these moments to sustain Issa Album, which is as basic as its title". In a mixed review, AllMusic's Neil Z. Yeung stated: "Overall, Issa is a competent statement that demonstrates promise from the young rapper." Brian Josephs of Spin said, "Issa Album needn't be The Infamous, but it could've benefitted from a clearer and tighter direction". Wren Graves of Consequence criticized the "repetitive odes to getting high, getting laid, and getting lots of money".

Commercial performance
Issa Album debuted at number two on the US Billboard 200 with 77,000 album-equivalent units, of which 22,000 were pure album sales. On November 24, 2020, the album was certified platinum by the Recording Industry Association of America (RIAA) for combined sales, streaming and track-sales equivalent of one million units in the United States.

Track listing

Notes
  signifies a co-producer
  signifies an uncredited co-producer

Sample credits
 "Bank Account" contains a sample of Coleridge-Taylor Perkinson's original composition "Flashbulbs".
 "Thug Life" contains a sample of "Something He Can Feel", written by Curtis Mayfield and performed by En Vogue.

Personnel
Credits adapted from Tidal and XXL.

Performers
 21 Savage – primary artist
 Young Thug – vocals (track 13)

Technical
 Alex Tumay – mixing (all tracks)
 Gordie Tumay – assistant mixing (all tracks)
 Joe LaPorta – mastering (all tracks)
 Blake Harden – recording (all tracks)
 Derrick Selby – recording (all tracks)
 Ethan Stevens – recording (all tracks)
 Anthony Gonzales – recording (all tracks)
 Brian Smith – recording (all tracks)
 Todd Bergman – uncredited recording (track 7)

Production
 Metro Boomin – production (tracks 1, 3, 6, 8, 9, 11, 13, 14), co-production (track 2)
 Zaytoven – uncredited co-production (track 1), production (track 8)
 21 Savage – production (track 2)
 Southside – production (tracks 4, 10), uncredited co-production (track 14)
 Jake One – co-production (tracks 4, 10)
 Sam Wish – co-production (track 4)
 Pi'erre Bourne – production (track 5)
 DJ Mustard – production (track 7)
 Twice as Nice – co-production (track 7)
 Wheezy – production (track 12)
 Cubeatz – uncredited co-production (track 13)

Charts

Weekly charts

Year-end charts

Certifications

References

2017 debut albums
Albums produced by Metro Boomin
21 Savage albums
Albums produced by Zaytoven
Albums produced by Southside (record producer)
Albums produced by DJ Mustard
Albums produced by Jake One
Albums produced by Cubeatz
Albums produced by Pi'erre Bourne
Epic Records albums